Arbër Dhrami (born 23 June 1988) is an Albanian professional footballer who plays as a striker.

Club career
On 6 August 2015, Dhrami signed with newly promoted club Tërbuni Pukë for an undisclosed fee, taking the vacant number 88 for the upcoming 2015–16 season.

Tërbuni commenced their first ever Albanian Superliga season with a 1–2 home loss against KF Tirana, in which Dhrami was substituted in 47th minute for Roland Peqini.

Dhrami left the team during the winter transfer window, and on 12 January 2016, and signed with Luftëtari Gjirokastër of Albanian First Division for the second part of 2015–16 season. In January 2017 he moved to Malta to play for Premier League strugglers Pembroke Athleta.

References

External links
 
 Onsports.gr Profile

1988 births
Living people
Sportspeople from Fier
Albanian footballers
Association football forwards
Flamurtari Vlorë players
KF Apolonia Fier players
Platanias F.C. players
KF Himara players
KF Butrinti players
KF Bylis Ballsh players
KF Tërbuni Pukë players
Luftëtari Gjirokastër players
Pembroke Athleta F.C. players
KF Oriku players
Kategoria Superiore players
Kategoria e Parë players
Super League Greece players
Albanian expatriate footballers
Expatriate footballers in Greece
Albanian expatriate sportspeople in Greece
Expatriate footballers in Malta
Albanian expatriate sportspeople in Malta